William Henry Merritt (born July 30, 1870 – November 17, 1937) was a Major League Baseball player who played catcher from -. He would play for the Boston Beaneaters, Chicago Colts, Louisville Colonels, Pittsburgh Pirates, and Cincinnati Reds.

In 401 games over eight seasons, Merritt posted a .272 batting average (384-for-1414) with 182 runs, 8 home runs and 196 RBI. He finished his career with a .943 fielding percentage playing at least one game at every position except pitcher.

References

External links

1870 births
1937 deaths
Major League Baseball catchers
Boston Beaneaters players
Chicago Colts players
Louisville Colonels players
Pittsburgh Pirates players
Cincinnati Reds players
19th-century baseball players
Memphis Giants players
Columbus Reds players
Lowell Tigers players
Haverhill Hustlers players
Taunton Tigers players
Manchester Colts players
Lawrence Colts players
Baseball players from Massachusetts
Woonsocket (minor league baseball) players